Carl Edvard Johansson (1864–1943) was a Swedish inventor and scientist.

Johansson invented the gauge block set, also known as "Jo Blocks" ("Johansson gauge blocks"). He was granted his first Swedish patent on 2 May 1901, Swedish patent No. 17017 called "Gauge Block Sets for Precision Measurement". He formed the Swedish company CE Johansson AB (CEJ AB), Eskilstuna, Sweden in 1911. The first CEJ gauge block set in America was sold to Henry M. Leland at Cadillac Automobile Co. around 1908.

At the end of his career, in 1923, Johansson started to work for Henry Ford at the Ford Motor Company, in Dearborn, Michigan. Ford bought the entire American company, CE Johansson Inc., that he had established 1918 in Poughkeepsie, New York and all the equipment was moved to Dearborn. Some of his Swedish employees that worked in Poughkeepsie were also employed by Ford. At the age of 72, he decided to retire and went back to Sweden. During his life he had crossed the Atlantic Ocean 22 times and spent a lot of time in America.

He received a number of awards and honors, including the large gold medal of the Royal Swedish Academy of Engineering Sciences, posthumously in 1943, shortly after his death.

Johansson and the inch
In the 1910s, the U.S. and U.K. definitions of the inch differed, with the U.S. inch being defined as 25.4000508mm (with a reference temperature of ) and the U.K. inch at 25.399977mm (with a reference temperature of ). When he started manufacturing gauge blocks in inch sizes in 1912, Johansson's compromise was to manufacture gauge blocks with a nominal size of 25.4mm, with a reference temperature of 20 degrees Celsius, accurate to within a few parts per million of both official definitions. Because Johansson's blocks were so popular, his blocks became the de facto standard for manufacturers in both countries, leading industry associations to adopt 25.4 mm as the standard "industrial inch" in both the U.K. (1930) and the U.S. (1933).  When the English-speaking nations jointly signed the International Yard and Pound Agreement of 1959, the inch was fixed at 25.4 mm worldwide, effectively endorsing what had already become common practice.

Family
He was married to Margareta Andersson in 1896. They had four children: Elsa, Signe, Edvard, and Gertrud.

References

Bibliography
 .

External links
 Starrett page "Wringability and Gage Blocks" by Dave Friedel, General Manager of Starrett's Webber Gage Division
 

1864 births
1943 deaths
20th-century Swedish inventors
20th-century Swedish engineers
Members of the Royal Swedish Academy of Engineering Sciences